Franco Cordova (born 21 June 1944) is a former Italian international football player who played as midfielder.

Born in Forlì but raised in Naples, he played for Catania, Inter and Brescia before settling in Rome at A.S. Roma and becoming team's captain.
He then left suddenly for AS Roma's rivals S.S. Lazio in 1976 where he played 3 seasons before ending his career at U.S. Avellino.

He also has 2 full caps for Italy, both in 1975.

His career ended with a 1-year and 2 months ban from football in the Totonero 1980 match-fixing scandal.

Honours
Inter
 Intercontinental Cup: 1965
 Serie A champion: 1965–66.

Roma
 Coppa Italia winner: 1968–69.
 Anglo-Italian Cup winner: 1972.

External links
 

Italian footballers
Italy international footballers
Association football midfielders
Serie A players
U.S. Avellino 1912 players
Brescia Calcio players
Catania S.S.D. players
Inter Milan players
S.S. Lazio players
A.S. Roma players
U.S. Salernitana 1919 players
People from Forlì
Footballers from Naples
1944 births
Living people
Footballers from Emilia-Romagna
Sportspeople from the Province of Forlì-Cesena